Bauyrzhan Orazgaliyev (born February 28, 1985) is a male freestyle wrestler from Kazakhstan. He participated in Men's freestyle 60 kg at 2008 Summer Olympics. He was eliminated in the 1/8 of final losing with Yogeshwar Dutt from India.

External links
 

Living people
1985 births
Wrestlers at the 2004 Summer Olympics
Wrestlers at the 2008 Summer Olympics
Olympic wrestlers of Kazakhstan
Kazakhstani male sport wrestlers
Wrestlers at the 2006 Asian Games
Asian Games competitors for Kazakhstan
21st-century Kazakhstani people